The LG CF360 is a cellular phone made by LG, and was sold basically for AT&T. It was released in December 2009, just before Christmas. It is a basic slide-up phone. In addition to the phone being black with blue numbers and accents, the phone is also in black with red numbers and accents.

Features

 Media .NET
 Video Sharing
 Multimedia Messaging
 Mobile E-mail
 Camera Phone
 Bluetooth
 Mobile Games
 AT&T GPS
 3G Speed
 Text Messaging
 Hands Free Speakerphone
 USB Connectivity .

References

CF360